Isabella of Denmark may refer to;

 Isabella of Austria (1501–1526), wife of Christian II of Denmark
 Princess Isabella of Denmark (b. 2007), daughter of Frederik, Crown Prince of Denmark